Sauvage River may refer to:

 Sauvage River (Felton River tributary), Quebec, Canada
 Sauvage River (Gentilly River tributary), Quebec, Canada

See also
 Sauvage (disambiguation)